Dhaivat is the sixth svara from the seven svaras of Hindustani music and Carnatic music. Dhaivat is the long form of the syllable ध. For simplicity in pronouncing while singing the syllable, Dhaivat is pronounced as Dha (notation - D). It is also called as धैवत in the Devanagri script.

Details
The following is the information about Dhaivat and its importance in Indian classical music :

 Dhaivat is the sixth svara in an octave or Saptak.
 Dhaivat is the immediate next svara of Pancham (Pa).
 It is said that Shadja is the basic svara from which all the other six svaras are produced. When we break the word Shadja then we get, Shad And Ja. It means that Shad is 6 and ja is 'giving birth' in Marathi. So basically the translation is :
  षड् - 6, ज -जन्म . Therefore, it collectively means giving birth to the other 6 notes of the music.
So the svara Dha is formed from Shadja.
 The frequency of Dhaivat is 400 Hz. The frequencies of the seven svaras are also given below: Sa 240 Hz, Re 270 Hz, Ga 300 Hz, Ma 320 Hz, Pa 360 Hz, Dha 400 Hz, and Ni 450 Hz, Sa 480 Hz (Taar Saptak) ........ (and so on).
Consequently, the Dha after the Pa of 320  Hz (Taar Saptak) has a frequency of 800  Hz i.e. the double of the Lower octave Dha.
There are 3 Shruti's of Dhaivat. Previously the main Shruti, not only for Re but for all the other svaras, was on the last Shruti but now it is considered to be on the 1st Shrurti.
For example, if these are the 3 Shruti's of Re then,

                     Previously this was the position of the main Shruti of Re.
                     ^ 
              1   2  3
              ^
              But now this position has become the main Shruti of Re.
 All the other svaras except Shadja (Sa) and Pancham (Pa) can be  or  but Sa and Pa are always Shuddha svaras. And hence svaras Sa and Pa are called Achal Svaras , since these svaras don't move from their original position. Svaras Ra, Ga, Ma, Dha, Ni are called Chal Svaras, since these svaras move from their original position.
    
     Sa, Re, Ga, Ma, Pa, Dha, Ni - Shuddha Svaras
    
     Re, Ga, Dha, Ni -  Svaras 
   
     Ma -  Svaras

 Ragas from Bhairav Thaat, Poorvi Thaat, Asavari Thaat, Bhairavi Thaat and Todi Thaat have Komal Dhaivat, rest of the thaats have Shuddha Dhaivat.
 Ragas where Dha is the Vadi svara - Raga Bhairav, etc. Ragas where Dha is the Samvadi svara - Raga Kalingda, etc.
 Hypothetically speaking, Dha is said to be Dharma, Dharma as in, the three main gods, Bhrama, Vishnu and Shiva were first created i.e. Sakar Bhrama (Sa) and then these three gods created Rishimuni i.e. Re and then Gandharvas were created for singing and then lord Indra or Raja Indra i.e. Mahipal was created and once the Mahipal (Raja) or the king was created, the Praja or the common citizens or the people were made, and as people have their own Dharma or duty/religion, the religion was made. Dha is made the acronym of Dharma or the duty/religion for showing the importance of the syllable Dha.
 Dhaivat is said to be sourced from the neighing of the horse.
 Dhaivat is associated with the planet Jupiter.
 Dhaivat is associated with Yellow colour.

See also
 List of Ragas in Hindustani classical music
 Svara
 Shadja (Sa)
 Rishabh (Re)
 Gandhar (Ga)
 Madhyam (Ma)
 Pancham (Pa)
 Nishad (Ni)

Dha (svara)

References

Hindustani music
Carnatic music